Rasim Ojagov (22 November 1933, Shaki, Azerbaijani SSR – 11 July 2006, Baku, Azerbaijan) was a Soviet-Azerbaijani film director and camera operator, Honoured Art Worker of Chechen-Ingush ASSR (1964), People's Artist of the Azerbaijan SSR (1982), laureate of the State Prize of the Azerbaijan SSR.

Biography
Rasim Ojagov was born on November 22, 1933 in Shaki, Azerbaijan. In his youth he dreamed of becoming a geologist. But, appearance of shooting group of “Azerbaijanfilm” film studio in his city made him to revise his choice of profession. After graduating from local school in Sheki in 1951, he attended film Institute in Moscow despite his parents' disapproval. In 1951-1956's, he studied at camera operator faculty of VGIK.

In 1965, he studied at director faculty of Azerbaijan Theatrical Institute named after I.Aliyev. In 1956, he worked as camera operator-director at “Azerbaijanfilm” and in 1973, as a director. In 1964, he conferred Honoured Art Worker of Chechen-Ingush ASSR. In 1950's, a new generation of directors, including Mukhtar Dadashov, Teyyub Akhundov, Alisattar Atakishiyev appeared. In these years Rasim Ojagov began his career. “Her great heart” film was the first film Ojagov. He was considered a professional in describing of psychological scenes. This film is about life of Sumgayit metallurgists. Mental sufferings of the workers are described in this film.

Filmography
Rasim Ojagov shot about 11 multireel films.

Awards
Laureate of the State Prize of the Azerbaijan SSR (1979, for the film “Birthday”);

Laureate of the USSR State Prize (1981, for the film “Interrogation”;
People's Artist of Azerbaijan.

References

1933 births
Soviet screenwriters
Male screenwriters
Azerbaijani writers
Azerbaijani cinematographers
Azerbaijani film directors
Recipients of the USSR State Prize
People from Shaki, Azerbaijan
2006 deaths
20th-century screenwriters
Burials at II Alley of Honor